Saltella is a genus of flies in the family Sepsidae.

Species
Saltella bezzii (Duda, 1926)
Saltella nigripes Robineau-Desvoidy, 1830
Saltella orientalis (Hendel, 1934)
Saltella setigera Brunetti, 1910
Saltella sphondylii (Schrank, 1803)

See also
List of sepsid fly species recorded in Europe

References

Sepsidae
Sciomyzoidea genera
Diptera of Europe
Diptera of Africa
Diptera of Asia
Taxa named by Jean-Baptiste Robineau-Desvoidy